West Clandon is a village in Surrey, England within 1 mile of the A3. It is situated one mile north west of the much smaller separate village of East Clandon.

West Clandon is served by Clandon railway station which runs stopping services via Cobham and Stoke D'Abernon as well as via Epsom to London Waterloo in one direction, and to Guildford in the other. Woking station is about 5 miles away (although there is no direct rail link) and offers many more destinations and a fast service to London.

History and landmarks
West Clandon appears in Domesday Book undivided as Clanedun held by Hugo (Hugh) from Edward de Salisbury. Its domesday assets were: 2½ hides; 1 church (replaced approximately one century later), 1 mill worth 3s, 2½ ploughs, woodland worth 5 hogs. It rendered £3 per year to its overlords.

Clandon House, a Palladian architecture mansion, is in the village, a house, hosting dedicated visit days and weddings, entirely run by The National Trust. Clandon Park is not part of the National Trust. Clandon Park is a 1000-acre agricultural Estate that is the Seat of the Earls of Onslow and is currently owned and managed by Rupert Charles William Bullard Onslow, 8th Earl of Onslow. George Duncumbe owned it from 1615 until 1642 on its gradual sale to Sir Richard Onslow starting with the large lodge in the park in 1642, and a series of transactions with the Onslow family, begun in 1650, was finally concluded in 1711 by the transference of the manor to Sir Richard Onslow, a mild Roundhead (Parliamentarian).

Clandon Park has been continually owned by successive Earls of Onslow as their Seat; as heirs to the lands of the Earl of Surrey, until the late 20th century the Earl was the largest private landowner in the county. Clandon Park remains under the ownership of the Earl of Onslow. The house, Clandon House is owned by National Trust & was largely destroyed by a fire in April 2015.

Church
The largely late 12th century church has later medieval roofs. There is a canonical sundial on the south wall. In the chancel are preserved, in a glass case, some medieval panels of oak; probably late 13th or early 14th-century date; the figures upon them are St. Peter and St. Paul on either side of Saint Thomas of Canterbury; the two apostles bear their respective emblems, the keys and the sword; the martyred archbishop between them has his right hand raised in benediction, while the left holds the cross staff; there are traces of gold on the nimbus of each saint, and the figures are coarsely outlined in black. Much of the pewing in the western part of the nave is nicely carved in dark wood imported from abroad by a former Earl of Onslow.

The tower had six bells all by Thomas Lester, 1741, but the third, fourth, and fifth were re-cast by Mears and Stainbank in 1875. One was inscribed in capitals 'At proper times my voice II raies, unto my bennifactor praise.' In 1913, these bells were destroyed by fire and six new bells by Mears and Stainbank were installed in 1914. In 1932, Mears and Stainbank added two new trebles and replaced the 1914 treble with a new bell, to give the present ring of eight.

The communion plate includes an Elizabethan cup and cover paten of the date 1569; also another paten of 1712 given by Sir Richard Onslow.

The registers begin in the unusually early year of 1536.

Amenities

The only shop within the parish bounds is the Clandon Park gift shop and the Garden Centre. The village has two pubs: The Onslow Arms and The Bull's Head, as well as a British Legion. The Onslow Arms closed for refurbishment in June 2010 until the end of that year.

Village residents can also join the village social group, called Rompers, which arranges lunches, coffees, cheese and wine, BBQ party and Winter party.

Folklore
Legend has it that a dragon once blocked the route to West Clandon. In commemoration there is a dragon cut into the chalk face of an old quarry. The legend was recorded in the Gentleman's Magazine in 1796, where it was recounted that the dragon infested one of the back lanes of the village. A soldier killed the dragon with the help of his dog, in return for being pardoned for desertion. The modern village sign depicts the battle between the dog and the dragon.

Nearby villages include Ockham, East and West Horsley. Local towns are Woking and Guildford.

Demography and housing

The average level of accommodation in the region composed of detached houses was 28%, the average that was apartments was 22.6%.

The proportion of households in the civil parish who owned their home outright compares to the regional average of 35.1%.  The proportion who owned their home with a loan compares to the regional average of 32.5%.  The remaining % is made up of rented dwellings (plus a negligible % of households living rent-free).

Notes

References

External links

 West Clandon Website
 Clandon Park Website

Villages in Surrey
Borough of Guildford
Civil parishes in Surrey
Surrey folklore
Dragons